Building 101 is a neoclassical building located in San Francisco's Dogpatch neighborhood, designed by Frederick H. Meyer. The building was built in 1917 for Bethlehem Steel, which used it as an administrative building while it owned the Bethlehem Shipbuilding Corporation operations on adjacent Pier 70.

The building was originally intended to house offices for 350 people, including executives, draftsmen, and naval architects, and included blueprint facilities. By 1945, it also included a Navy cafeteria and a private branch exchange for telephone service. The building has 56,268 square feet of space and was unused since 1992. It was renovated and reimagined into a furniture gallery and restaurant by RH, opening in 2022.

References

Office buildings in San Francisco